is a 1957 Japanese tokusatsu fantasy drama film directed by Kimiyoshi Yasuda, and written by Tetsuro Yoshida. Produced and distributed by Daiei Film, it is the sixth in the Suzunosuke Akado film series, after Suzunosuke Akado: The Vacuum Slash of Asuka, which was released in the same year on August 25. Suzunosuke Akado: The One-Legged Demon stars Shoji Umewaka, Tamao Nakamura, Yatarō Kurokawa, Eigoro Onoe, and Ryūzaburō Mitsuoka. The film was followed by Suzunosuke Akado: The Birdman with Three Eyes the following year.

Plot 
Suzunosuke Akado (Shoji Umewaka) faces off against a gang of cutthroats, who are led by a peg-legged pirate.

Cast

Release 
Suzunosuke Akado: The One-Legged Demon was released in Japan on December 28, 1957.

The film was released on DVD by Victor Film on December 20, 2002.

Notes

References

External links 

 
 

1957 films
1950s fantasy films
Daiei Film films
Films directed by Kimiyoshi Yasuda
Japanese sequel films
Japanese science fiction films
1950s science fiction films
Color sequels of black-and-white films
Daiei Film tokusatsu films
1950s Japanese films